Salvador Sánchez (1959–1982) was a Mexican boxer.

Salvador Sánchez may also refer to:
 Salvador Sánchez Cerén (born 1944), 45th President of El Salvador
 Salvador Sánchez II (born 1985), Mexican featherweight boxer
 Salvador Sánchez (footballer) (born 1995), Argentine footballer
 Salvador Sánchez Ponce (born 1991), Spanish footballer
 Salvador Sánchez Barbudo (1857–1917), Spanish painter